The Lafayette Street Overpass is a historic bridge in Fayetteville, Arkansas. It is a three-span reinforced concrete girder structure, carrying Lafayette Street over the tracks of the St. Louis–San Francisco Railway. It features an Art Deco railing, with a metal balustrade covering concrete piers with inset light fixtures. The bridge was built in 1938 by Edward B. Mooney, Inc.

The bridge was listed on the National Register of Historic Places in 1995.

See also
List of bridges documented by the Historic American Engineering Record in Arkansas
List of bridges on the National Register of Historic Places in Arkansas
National Register of Historic Places listings in Washington County, Arkansas

References

External links

Road bridges on the National Register of Historic Places in Arkansas
Bridges completed in 1938
Historic American Engineering Record in Arkansas
National Register of Historic Places in Fayetteville, Arkansas
Concrete bridges in the United States
1938 establishments in Arkansas
Transportation in Washington County, Arkansas
St. Louis–San Francisco Railway
Art Deco architecture in Arkansas